The Odesa National Scientific Library is a public library established in 1829 in Odesa, Ukraine. The library moved to its current location in 1907, into a new building designed by architect Fyodor Nesturkh in neo-Greek style. The library has been renamed numerous times throughout history, arriving to its current name in 2015. The library has a collection of over 5 million books, including 200,000 rare editions.

References

External links

Academic libraries in Ukraine
National libraries in Ukraine
Culture of Odesa
Institutions with the title of National in Ukraine